Sudden is a Mediacorp Channel 8 law drama. It starred Romeo Tan, Rui En, Rebecca Lim & Zhang Zhenhuan as casts of the series.

It was broadcast on MediaCorp Channel 8 from 2 September 2013 to 27 September 2013.

Premise
A horrific accident complicates the lives of four lawyers – Fang Qiliang, Cheng Chuning, Guo Weiqian and Sun Dalun.

Losing his mobility as a result of the accident, Qiliang drifts apart from his girlfriend Chuning because of the pain and misgivings he had. Meanwhile, Chuning realised that her memory is receding and she fears that she may soon forget Qiliang.

Weiqian lost her father in the same accident, and his last words were conveyed to her by Sun Dalun, an eye witness who missed his appointment for a promising position in a prestigious law firm.

Cast

Other casts

Episodes

Trivia
Dai Xiangyu was initially cast as the male lead. Due to his non renewal of contract, Romeo Tan was roped in.
This is Rebecca Lim (as Huang Yixin)'s second villainous role after Unriddle 2.
Pan Lingling was originally going to play the role of Situ Xinmei, but she had to turn down her role to undergo surgery to remove her breast cysts around Show 1 of Star Awards 2013. The role was given to Constance Song.
At the beginning of each episode before the opening video, footage of Romeo Tan and Rui En in Tasmania is shown and this will be linked to the later part of the drama. Behind-the-scenes photos of the travel are also shown during the ending credits of each episode.
Rebecca Lim's second dual role after Crime Busters x 2. This is also her third law drama after two English productions The Pupil and Code of Law.

Accolades

See also
List of programmes broadcast by Mediacorp Channel 8

References

Singaporean drama television series
Singapore Chinese dramas
Channel 8 (Singapore) original programming